Relic Online was an online gaming system that Relic/THQ uses for matchmaking in some Relic Entertainment games, replacing its previous use of GameSpy Arcade (Dawn of War) and WON (Homeworld). Relic Online was developed by Relic/THQ and Quazal, and is completely separate from any GameSpy/WON systems. It has not been backported to older games such as Dawn of War and its expansions, but has appeared in Relic's Company of Heroes series of games. Company of Heroes: Opposing Fronts introduced new features to Relic Online such as arranged team automatches, with the changes being patched into the previous Company of Heroes games as well. Relic Online was notably absent in Relic/THQ's Dawn of War II, however, which instead used a combination of Steam and Games for Windows – Live.

It was subsequently replaced by Steamworks on April 23, 2013, which is also used for Company of Heroes 2.

Features
Known features include, based on Company of Heroes:
 The normal basic lobby/finding game systems
 Better skill-based matching for games
 Better NAT support
 Better ranking system
 Better friends lists
 Better integration with the game itself

Games using Relic Online
 Company of Heroes (2006)
 Company of Heroes: Opposing Fronts (2007)
 Company of Heroes: Tales of Valor (2009)

References

External links
 Quazal and THQ Join Forces
 Say Goodbye To Gamespy In CoH
 relicrank.com - The Company of Heroes ladder

Multiplayer video game services
Relic Entertainment